is a  Japanese racing driver.

Racing record

Complete Formula Nippon results 
(key) (Races in bold indicate pole position) (Races in italics indicate fastest lap)

Complete JGTC/Super GT Results 
(key) (Races in bold indicate pole position) (Races in italics indicate fastest lap)

24 Hours of Le Mans results

References 

1975 births
Living people
Japanese racing drivers
Japanese Formula 3 Championship drivers
Formula Nippon drivers
Super GT drivers
24 Hours of Le Mans drivers

Toyota Gazoo Racing drivers
TOM'S drivers
Team LeMans drivers
Nürburgring 24 Hours drivers
Mercedes-AMG Motorsport drivers
21st-century Japanese people